Paraivongius rubricollis is a species of leaf beetle. It is reported from the Republic of the Congo, the Democratic Republic of the Congo and Sudan. It was first described from Garamba National Park by Brian J. Selman in 1972. Host plants for the species include Combretum verticillatum, C. binderianum, Combretum spp., Mitragyna stipulosa, and it has also been collected on Imperata cylindrica and Urena lobata.

References

Eumolpinae
Beetles of Africa
Insects of the Republic of the Congo
Beetles of the Democratic Republic of the Congo
Insects of Sudan
Beetles described in 1972